The telephone-pole beetle (Micromalthus debilis) is a beetle native to the eastern United States, and the only living representative of the otherwise extinct family Micromalthidae. They have an unusual lifecycle involving asexually reproducing (parthenogenetic) female larvae, as well as non-functional "ghost adults".

Taxonomy
Classification of M. debilis was historically controversial and unsettled. The species, first reported by John Lawrence LeConte in 1878, was long considered one of the Polyphaga, and placed in the Lymexylidae or Telegeusidae, or as a family within the Cantharoidea.  However, characteristics of larvae, wings, and male genitalia show that it is in the suborder Archostemata, where it has been placed since 1999.

Morphology and life cycle

The head is larger than the thorax, with large eyes protruding from either side. 

The larvae are wood-borers that feed on moist and decaying chestnut and oak logs. They have also been reported as causing damage to buildings and poles (hence the name). 

The life cycle is unusual in that the cerambycoid stage of the larva gives birth via parthenogenesis to caraboid larvae, or more rarely, develops into an adult female. Adult males also rarely develop, consuming their mother from the inside. Development into adults is triggered by high temperatures, but this also results in high mortality of larvae. The adult females have a lifespan of six days, while males only live for around 12 hours, with a strongly biased sex ratio towards females. The adults of both sexes are sterile, and are vestigial remnants of a time when the lifecycle involved sexual reproduction. The loss of sexual reproduction is likely associated with its infection by Wolbachia bacteria.

In an experimental study, heating was used to generate substantial numbers of adults to simulate the now non-functional adult life cycle. This species showed sex-role reversal. Females preferred to mate with males that originated from a different log than the one from which they originated, with a "dance" motion involving shaking of their abdomens and beating of their wings likely used to reject males. Females also competed for and initiated interactions with males, grasping the males' genitalia with their own.

Evolutionary history 
Genetic studies have placed Micromalthus as more closely related to Ommatidae than to Cupedidae within Archostemata. A close relationship between Ommatidae and Micromalthidae is supported by several morphological characters, including those of the mandibles and male genitalia. The oldest record of Micromalthidae is Archaeomalthus from the Upper Permian of Russia around 252 million years old, which is morphologically similar in many respects to Micromalthus including an only weakly sclerotised body. Several other fossil genera of the family are known including Cretomalthus, known from a larva found in Early Cretaceous (Barremian) Lebanese amber. As well as Protomalthus from the mid-Cretaceous (Albian-Cenomanian) Burmese amber of Myanmar.

Fossils of Micromalthus are known from the Miocene aged Dominican amber (adults and larvae, which were found to not be distinguishable from the living species) and Mexican amber (larvae), the upper Eocene Rovno amber of Ukraine (Micromalthus priabonicus), the early Eocene (Ypresian) aged Oise amber of France (Micromalthus eocenicus) A possible specimen of Micromalthus is known from Burmese amber, but the poor preservation of the specimen makes the assignment tentantive.

Status 
Reports of the species are infrequent and it is unknown whether they are rare, or common and unrecognized. A recent study by Bertone et al. (2016) found telephone-pole beetles in a survey of the indoor arthropod fauna in 50 houses located in and around Raleigh, North Carolina. A recent survey found that the species had spread to every continent except Australia. With finds in South Africa, Hong Kong, Belize, Cuba, Brazil, Japan, Hawaii, Italy and Austria, the dispersal is likely connected to the timber trade.

References

External links
 
 
 Tree of Life page, with pictures and video
 The life cycle of Micromalthus debilis

Archostemata
Beetles of North America
Beetles described in 1878